Seán Martin is a Fianna Fáil Councillor on Cork City Council representing the Cork City South Central Local Electoral Area. He was co-opted to the Council in July 1997 to the seat vacated by his brother, Micheál, following his Ministerial appointment after the 1997 Irish general election. Seán Martin retained his seat in the 1999 Irish local elections and at each subsequent election. He works with the ESB and served as Lord Mayor of Cork from 2004 to 2005.

As of 2021, Martin is the leader of Fianna Fáil on Cork City Council and serves on several committees of the council. He represents Cork City Council on the board of the Association of Irish Local Government, the Cork Education and Training Board (ETB) and Cork Film Festival.

References

External links
Electoral History
O'Driscoll elected Lord Mayor
O'Driscoll elected in Cork

Living people
Fianna Fáil politicians
Local councillors in Cork (city)
Lord Mayors of Cork
Year of birth missing (living people)